Joseph T. McHale (born September 26, 1963) is a former American football linebacker who played for one season in the National Football League (NFL). After playing college football for the Delaware Fightin' Blue Hens, he signed with the New York Jets as an undrafted free agent in 1987. He was waived before the season by the Jets, and signed by the New England Patriots shortly thereafter. He played in three games for the Patriots in 1987.

Born in Passaic, New Jersey, McHale played prep football at Morris Catholic High School.

References

1963 births
Living people
Sportspeople from Passaic, New Jersey
Players of American football from New Jersey
American football linebackers
Delaware Fightin' Blue Hens football players
New England Patriots players